Bogorodsky District is an administrative and municipal district (raion), one of the thirty-nine in Kirov Oblast, Russia. It is located in the southeastern central part of the oblast. Its administrative center is the urban locality (an urban-type settlement) of Bogorodskoye. Population:  6,805 (2002 Census);  The population of Bogorodskoye accounts for 57.3% of the district's total population.

References

Notes

Sources

Districts of Kirov Oblast